Birsay, Saskatchewan is an unincorporated community in southern Saskatchewan, Canada. It is located in the Rural Municipality of Coteau No. 255.

History 
Prior to January 1, 2004, Birsay was a village, but it was restructured as a hamlet on that date.

Demographics 

References 

Coteau No. 255, Saskatchewan
Designated places in Saskatchewan
Former villages in Saskatchewan
Unincorporated communities in Saskatchewan
Populated places disestablished in 2004